Nikolai Valeriyevich Tolstopyatov (born 12 May 2002) is a Russian football player who plays for FC KAMAZ Naberezhnye Chelny on loan from FC Spartak Moscow.

Club career
He made his debut in the Russian Football National League for FC Spartak-2 Moscow on 17 July 2021 in a game against FC Torpedo Moscow.

On 8 July 2022, Tolstopyatov joined FC KAMAZ Naberezhnye Chelny.

References

External links
 
 Profile by Russian Football National League

2002 births
People from Yevpatoria Municipality
Living people
Russian footballers
Association football defenders
FC Spartak-2 Moscow players
FC KAMAZ Naberezhnye Chelny players
Russian First League players